is a Japanese manga artist. She wrote and illustrated various manga series, including, Homemade Home, Forbidden Dance, Sand Chronicles, Piece: Kanojo no Kioku, Tennen Bitter Chocolate, SOS, and Chouchou Kumo. Ashihara won the 50th Shogakukan Manga Award for her manga series Sand Chronicles, as well as the 58th Shogakukan Manga Award for Piece: Kanojo no Kioku.  Her first published work, "Sono hanashi okotowari shimasu" (lit. "That Sweet Organ Song"), premiered in Bessatsu Shōjo Comic in 1994 and is featured in SOS.

Works
Girls Lesson (1995–1996)
Homemade Home (1996)
Room Full of Falling Stars (Hoshifuru Heya de) (1997)
Forbidden Dance (Tenshi no Kiss) (1997–1998)
Derby Queen (1999–2000)
MiSS (2000–2001)
Tennen Bitter Chocolate (2001–2002)
Pinky Promise (Yubikiri) (2002)
Bitter: Nakechau Koi Monogatari (2003) (contributor)
SOS (2003)
Sand Chronicles (Sunadokei) (2003–2006)
Bitter II (2004) (contributor)
Butterfly Cloud (Chouchou Kumo) (2006)
The Moon and the Lake (Tsuki to Mizuumi) (2007)
Konbini S (2008)Piece: Kanojo no Kioku (2008–2013)Bread & Butter (2013–2020)Sexy Tanaka-san'' (2018–present)

References

External links
 

1974 births
20th-century Japanese women writers
21st-century Japanese women writers
Japanese female comics artists
Female comics writers
Living people
Women manga artists
Manga artists from Hyōgo Prefecture